Events from the 1000s in England.

Incumbents
Monarch – Ethelred

Events
 1000
 English fleet invades the Isle of Man.
 English invasion of Cumbria fails.
 Heroic poem The Battle of Maldon composed.
 1001
First Battle of Alton: English fail to repel Viking raiders.
 Battle of Pinhoe (Devon): English fail to repel Viking raiders.
 Edward the Martyr canonised.
 Ælfgar is consecrated Bishop of Elmham (following the death on 7 October of Æthelstan).
 Æthelred becomes Bishop of Cornwall but dies shortly after.
 1002
 8 January – Wulfsige III, Bishop of Sherborne, dies and is succeeded by Æthelric.
 £24,000 of Danegeld paid to the Vikings in return for them leaving England.
 King Æthelred the Unready marries (as his second wife) Emma, daughter of Richard I, Duke of Normandy, who receives her predecessor's Anglo-Saxon name, Ælfgifu.
 13 November – St. Brice's Day massacre: Æthelred orders the deaths of leading Danes in England.
 1003
 Sweyn Forkbeard, King of Denmark, invades England in retaliation for the St. Brice's Day massacre.
 1004
 Vikings raid Devon and East Anglia.
 1005
 16 November – Ælfric, Archbishop of Canterbury, dies, leaving ships to the people of Wiltshire and Kent in his will, with his best, equipped for sixty men, going to King Æthelred.
 Continued Viking raids on southern England.
 1006
 Ælfheah is elevated from Bishop of Winchester to Archbishop of Canterbury.
 Summer–Autumn – Danish Viking raiders led by Sweyn Forkbeard raid the south-east from the Isle of Wight to Reading in the Thames Valley where they overwinter at the Wallingford river crossing.
 1007
 £36,000 of Danegeld paid to the Vikings in return for them not raiding England for two years.
 1008
 Æthelred and Archbishop Wulfstan of York pass laws for the protection of Christianity in England.
 1009
 New English fleet assembled.
 1 August – Vikings occupy Sandwich, Kent, attack London, and burn Oxford.

Births
 1001
Godwin, Earl of Wessex (died 1053)
 1003/1004
 King Edward the Confessor (died 1066)
 1004
 Princess Goda of England (died 1055)

Deaths
 1000/1001
 17 November – Ælfthryth, queen consort of England (born c. 945)
 1001
 7 October – Æthelstan, Bishop of Elmham
 1005
 16 November – Ælfric of Abingdon, Archbishop of Canterbury

References